Chhatak Cement Factory also known as Chhatak Cement Company Limited or simply Chhatak Cement is the first and oldest cement factory in Bangladesh, that is located on the bank of Surma River in Chhatak Upazila of Sylhet. It was established in 1941 as Assam Bengal Cement Company. The annual production capacity is 2 lakh 3 thousand metric tons. Its raw material, limestone is imported from Meghalaya, India and stone is also collected from Takerghat's own stone quarry. Chhatak Cement is exported to Assam.

Location 
Chhatak Cement Factory is situated in Chhatak Upazila of Sunamganj district. It is 32 km away from Sylhet.

History
It was established in 1937 as a private company when it was namely Assam Bengal Cement Company. After the Indo-Pakistani War of 1965, when the factory was abandoned by the private owner, it came under the control of the EPIDC in 1966. After the independence of Bangladesh, it came under the control of the BMOGC, later the BMEDC, and lastly from 1st July, 1982 it is handed over to BCIC.

See also
Economy of Sylhet

References

External link
 Chhatak Cement

1941 establishments
Cement companies of Bangladesh
Economy of Sylhet
Organisations based in Sylhet
Chhatak Upazila